The direct sum is an operation between structures in abstract algebra, a branch of mathematics. It is defined differently, but analogously, for different kinds of structures. To see how the direct sum is used in abstract algebra, consider a more elementary kind of structure, the abelian group. To add ordered pairs, we define the sum  to be ; in other words addition is defined coordinate-wise. For example, the direct sum , where  is real coordinate space, is the Cartesian plane, . A similar process can be used to form the direct sum of two vector spaces or two modules.

This relies on the fact that the direct sum is associative up to isomorphism.

The direct sum of finitely many abelian groups, vector spaces, or modules is canonically isomorphic to the corresponding direct product. This is false, however, for some algebraic objects, like nonabelian groups.

In the case where infinitely many objects are combined, the direct sum and direct product are not isomorphic, even for abelian groups, vector spaces, or modules. As an example, consider the direct sum and direct product of (countably) infinitely many copies of the integers. An element in the direct product is an infinite sequence, such as (1,2,3,...) but in the direct sum, there is a requirement that all but finitely many coordinates be zero, so the sequence (1,2,3,...) would be an element of the direct product but not of the direct sum, while (1,2,0,0,0,...) would be an element of both. Often, if a + sign is used, all but finitely many coordinates must be zero, while if some form of multiplication is used, all but finitely many coordinates must be 1. The direct sum  is contained in the direct product , but is strictly smaller when the index set  is infinite, because an element of the direct product can have infinitely many nonzero coordinates.

Examples
The xy-plane, a two-dimensional vector space, can be thought of as the direct sum of two one-dimensional vector spaces, namely the x and y axes. In this direct sum, the x and y axes intersect only at the origin (the zero vector).

Each Ai is called a direct summand of A.  If the index set is finite, the direct sum is the same as the direct product. In the case of groups, if the group operation is written as  the phrase "direct sum" is used, while if the group operation is written  the phrase "direct product" is used. When the index set is infinite, the direct sum is not the same as the direct product since the direct sum has the extra requirement that all but finitely many coordinates must be zero.

Internal and external direct sums

A distinction is made between internal and external direct sums, though the two are isomorphic. If the summands are defined first, and then the direct sum is defined in terms of the summands, we have an external direct sum. For example, if we define the real numbers  and then define  the direct sum is said to be external.

This is expressible as an internal direct sum .

Types of direct sum

Direct sum of abelian groups

The direct sum of abelian groups is a prototypical example of a direct sum. Given two such groups  and  their direct sum  is the same as their direct product. That is, the underlying set is the Cartesian product  and the group operation  is defined component-wise:

This definition generalizes to direct sums of finitely many abelian groups.

For an arbitrary family of groups  indexed by  their 

The direct sum of an infinite family  of non-trivial groups is a proper subgroup of the product group

Direct sum of modules

The direct sum of modules is a construction which combines several modules into a new module.

The most familiar examples of this construction occur when considering vector spaces, which are modules over a field.  The construction may also be extended to Banach spaces and Hilbert spaces.

Direct sum in categories

An additive category is an abstraction of the properties of the category of modules. In such a category, finite products and coproducts agree and the direct sum is either of them, cf. biproduct.

General case:
For example, in the category of abelian groups, direct sum is a coproduct. This is also true in the category of modules.

Direct sums versus coproducts in category of groups

So for this category, a categorical direct sum is often simply called a coproduct to avoid any possible confusion.

Direct sum of group representations

The direct sum of group representations generalizes the direct sum of the underlying modules, adding a group action to it.

Another equivalent way of defining the direct sum is as follows:

In this case,  is given as

Direct sum of rings

Thus  is not a coproduct in the category of rings, and should not be written as a direct sum. (The coproduct in the category of commutative rings is the tensor product of rings. In the category of rings, the coproduct is given by a construction similar to the free product of groups.)

Use of direct sum terminology and notation is especially problematic when dealing with infinite families of rings: If  is an infinite collection of nontrivial rings, then the direct sum of the underlying additive groups can be equipped with termwise multiplication, but this produces a rng, that is, a ring without a multiplicative identity.

Direct sum of matrices

Direct sum of topological vector spaces

This is true if and only if when considered as additive topological groups (so scalar multiplication is ignored),  is the topological direct sum of the topological subgroups  and  

In contrast to algebraic direct sums, the existence of such a complement is no longer guaranteed for topological direct sums. 

A vector subspace is called  if it is not a complemented subspace. 
For example, every vector subspace of a Hausdorff TVS that is not a closed subset is necessarily uncomplemented. 
Every closed vector subspace of a Hilbert space is complemented. 
But every Banach space that is not a Hilbert space necessarily possess some uncomplemented closed vector subspace.

Homomorphisms

The direct sum  comes equipped with a projection homomorphism  for each j in I and a coprojection  for each j in I.  Given another algebraic structure  (with the same additional structure) and homomorphisms  for every j in I, there is a unique homomorphism , called the sum of the gj, such that  for all j.  Thus the direct sum is the coproduct in the appropriate category.

See also
Direct sum of groups
Direct sum of permutations
Direct sum of topological groups
Restricted product
Whitney sum

Notes

References

Abstract algebra